Okahola is an unincorporated community in Lamar County, in the U.S. state of Mississippi.

History
Ofahoma is a name derived from the Choctaw language, purported to mean either (sources vary) "scarce water" or "sounding water".

The community is located on the Norfolk Southern Railway. Okahola is served by a community center that also doubles as a voting precinct.

References

Unincorporated communities in Mississippi
Unincorporated communities in Lamar County, Mississippi
Mississippi placenames of Native American origin